Iván Velásquez (born August 27, 1976 in Cartagena, Colombia) is a Colombian footballer currently playing for Independiente Medellín of the Primera A in Colombia. He played as a striker.

Teams
  Independiente Santa Fe 1999
  Deportes Tolima 2000-2001
  Atlético Nacional 2001-2003
  Deportes Tolima 2004
  Quilmes 2005
  Atlético Junior 2006
  Caracas FC 2006-2007
  Deportes Quindío 2007-2008
  Once Caldas 2008
  Atlético Huila 2009-2010
  Mineros 2011
  Independiente Medellín 2011–present

Titles
  Caracas FC 2006-2007 (Venezuelan Primera División Championship)

Honours
  Deportes Quindío 2008 (Top Scorer Torneo Apertura Primera A Championship)

External links
 
 

1976 births
Living people
Colombian footballers
Colombian expatriate footballers
Atlético Huila footballers
Atlético Junior footballers
Atlético Nacional footballers
Deportes Quindío footballers
Deportes Tolima footballers
Independiente Santa Fe footballers
Independiente Medellín footballers
Once Caldas footballers
Quilmes Atlético Club footballers
Caracas FC players
A.C.C.D. Mineros de Guayana players
Categoría Primera A players
Argentine Primera División players
Expatriate footballers in Argentina
Expatriate footballers in Venezuela
Association football forwards
Sportspeople from Cartagena, Colombia